ZSE may refer to:
 Zagreb Stock Exchange in Zagreb, Croatia
 Zimbabwe Stock Exchange in Harare
 Pierrefonds Airport in Saint-Pierre, Réunion (IATA airport code)
 Seattle Air Route Traffic Control Center, abbreviated ZSE